Animal print is a clothing and fashion style in which the garment is made to resemble the pattern of the skin and fur, feathers or scales of animals such as a leopard, zebra, giraffe, tiger or cow. Animal print is also used for room decoration, handbags and footwear and even some jewelry. A major difference between animal prints and fur clothing is that animal prints today very often use fake fur instead of animal coat.

History

Animal prints have long been a popular style for many reasons. For one, they are generally expensive and considered rather exotic; hence they are a symbol of wealth and status. Throughout history, kings and other high people have used animal print rugs and such as a sign of status just as mounted animals are kept as trophies. Animal print became popular for women in the United States in the late 1960s during the Bohemian movement.

Other uses
Besides a distinctive natural animal pattern on clothing, "animal prints" may also refer to art prints of animals, printed on canvas or paper. The art prints may replicate the same skin or fur pattern found on the animal, but a flat photographic representation printed on artistic media, such as for as wall decorations. The prints are not limited to just the animal's skin or fur pattern, but may be any part of the animal and still be called an animal print.

Animal print applications extend beyond clothing and art prints and are commonly used for other decorations, including rugs, wallpaper, or painted surfaces. In addition, animal prints may be used in designs for race cars, airplanes, signage, building exteriors, or safety gear such as helmets the NFL team, Cincinnati Bengals, uses.

Environmental Concerns 
Many environmentalists do not agree with the use of animal print jackets as they promote the killing and bad usage of animals.

See also
Fake fur
Fur clothing
Fur coat

References

External links
 

Clothing